Hoogervorst is a Dutch surname. Notable people with the surname include:

Hans Hoogervorst (born 1956), Dutch political and business figure
Jan Hoogervorst, Dutch organizational theorist and business executive
Jeffrey Hoogervorst, Dutch footballer

Dutch-language surnames